Zanjanrud may refer to:
Zanjanrud, Iran, a village in Zanjan Province
Zanjanrud District, an administrative subdivision of Zanjan Province
Zanjanrud-e Bala Rural District, an administrative subdivision of Zanjan Province
Zanjanrud-e Pain Rural District, an administrative subdivision of Zanjan Province